In physical organic chemistry, a free-energy relationship or Gibbs energy relation  relates the logarithm of a reaction rate constant or equilibrium constant for one series of chemical reactions with the logarithm of the rate or equilibrium constant for a related series of reactions. Free energy relationships establish the extent at which bond formation and breakage happen in the transition state of a reaction, and in combination with kinetic isotope experiments a reaction mechanism can be determined. Free energy relationships are often used to calculate equilibrium constants since they are experimentally difficult to determine.

The most common form of free-energy relationships are linear free-energy relationships (LFER). The Brønsted catalysis equation describes the relationship between the ionization constant of a series of catalysts and the reaction rate constant for a reaction on which the catalyst operates. The Hammett equation predicts the equilibrium constant or reaction rate of a reaction from a substituent constant and a reaction type constant. The Edwards equation relates the nucleophilic power to polarisability and basicity. The Marcus equation is an example of a quadratic free-energy relationship (QFER).

IUPAC has suggested that this name should be replaced by linear Gibbs energy relation, but at present there is little sign of acceptance of this change.
The area of physical organic chemistry which deals with such relations is commonly referred to as 'linear free-energy relationships'.

Chemical and physical properties

A typical LFER relation for predicting the equilibrium concentration of a compound or solute in the vapor phase to a condensed (or solvent) phase can be defined as follows (following M.H. Abraham and co-workers):

where  is some free-energy related property, such as an adsorption or absorption constant, anesthetic potency, etc. The lowercase letters are system constants describing the contribution of the aerosol phase to the sorption process. The capital letters are solute descriptors representing the complementary properties of the compounds. Specifically,
  is the gas–liquid partition constant on n-hexadecane at 298 K;
  = the excess molar refraction ( for n-alkanes).
  = the ability of a solute to stabilize a neighbouring dipole by virtue of its capacity for orientation and induction interactions;
  = the solute's effective hydrogen bond acidity; and
  = the solute's effective hydrogen-bond basicity.
The complementary system constants are identified as
  = the contribution from cavity formation and dispersion interactions;
  = the contribution from interactions with solute n-electrons and pi electrons;
  = the contribution from dipole-type interactions;
  = the contribution from hydrogen-bond basicity (because a basic sorbent will interact with an acidic solute); and
  = the contribution from hydrogen-bond acidity to the transfer of the solute from air to the aerosol phase.

where  is McGowan's characteristic molecular volume in cubic centimeters per mole divided by 100.

See also 
 Brønsted catalysis equation
 Hammett equation
 Taft equation
 Swain–Lupton equation
 Grunwald–Winstein equation
 Yukawa–Tsuno equation
 Edwards equation
 Marcus equation
 Bell–Evans–Polanyi principle
 Quantitative structure–activity relationship

References

External links 
 

Solutions
Physical organic chemistry